Aane Pataki is a 2013 Kannada comedy film written and directed by debutant Chandrashekar Bandiyappa. The film stars Srujan Lokesh in the lead.

Plot
The movie is about a wannabe actor who comes to the city aspiring to become a hero. However, because of his innocence and naivety he is often teased and made fun. He is invited to a party at the house of a movie producer because of an error made by the producers secretary. There he falls in love with a "Star Guest".

Cast 
 Srujan Lokesh as Besagarahalli Bhyregowda
 Parvathi Nirban as Rakshitha
 Bhasker as Adi
 Rangayana Raghu as Govindanna
 Sadhu Kokila as Chinnadappa
 Jai Jagadish as Jagadish
 Vijayalakshmi Singh as Vijayalakshmi
 Rockline Sudhakar
 Somanna Jadar
 Cable Anand
 Akul

Soundtrack

The soundtrack of the album was released on 7 May 2013.

Reception

Critical response 

A critic from The Times of India scored the film at 3 out of 5 stars and says "Srujan Lokesh has tried his best, but could have done better. Parvathi Nirbhang hardly has anything to do. However, you can look forward to some catchy tunes by Dharma Vish. Sangeetha Rajeev makes a commendable debut as a singer by rendering the pleasant number ‘Entane Tharagathi…’ Wali's camera work is average". B S Srivani from Deccan Herald wrote "Towards the end, it is soapy mayhem with romance taking a backseat. “Aane Pataaki” had so much to offer but disappoints like the firecracker after which it is named, not going out with a bang but a whimper". A Sharadhaa from The New Indian Express wrote "The only attraction in the songs are some foreign dancers sizzling in shorts. The editing table has done an amateurish job. The Verdict: Filled with old jokes, this is a film people can definitely avoid". A critic from Bangalore Mirror wrote  "He puts in the effort, but it is a wrong project really. Parvati Nirban’s only expression in the film is a smile and using her photograph instead would have been a cost-saving decision.  The director has a long way to go before he understands how and why films should be made".

References

External links 

2013 films
2010s Kannada-language films
Indian comedy films
Indian remakes of American films
2013 comedy films
Films directed by Chandrashekar Bandiyappa